Pietro Lombardo is also the Italian version of the name of the theologian Peter Lombard.
Pietro Lombardo (1435–1515) was an Italian Renaissance sculptor and architect; born in Carona (Ticino), he was the father of Tullio Lombardo and Antonio Lombardo.

In the late 15th century, Pietro Lombardo sculpted many Venetian tombs with the help of his sons.  These tombs included those of Dante Alighieri, Doge Pasquale Malipiero and Pietro Mocenigo.  He was the architect and chief sculptor for the Church of Santa Maria dei Miracoli, Venice (1481–1489) and of San Giobbe in Venice. He also depicted saints and the Virgin Mary on the walls of several Catholic churches.

Pietro Lombardo is mentioned in line 27 of Canto XLV by Ezra Pound as the first in a list of Italian renaissance artists whom Pound admired.

References

External links 

 

Italian Renaissance sculptors
1435 births
1515 deaths
Architects from Ticino
Republic of Venice artists
Italian Renaissance architects
15th-century Italian architects
15th-century Italian sculptors
Italian male sculptors
16th-century Italian sculptors